Ballymoreen, or Ballymurreen (Baile Amoraoin in Irish), is a townland in the civil parish of the same name in County Tipperary in Ireland. It is located in the south-east corner of North Tipperary, between Littleton and Horse and Jockey.

References

Townlands of County Tipperary
Eliogarty